Gold Fame Citrus is a 2015 speculative fiction novel by Claire Vaye Watkins. It is her second book, but her first novel. The work received positive reviews.

Plot
The novel is set in a near-future dystopian California ravaged by extreme drought. The landscape of the Southwest is increasingly dominated by the rapidly expanding, ever shifting sands known as the Amargosa Dune Sea.  Luz Dunn is a 25 year old former model squatting in Los Angeles, where it has not rained for years. At birth, Luz was symbolically adopted by the Bureau of Conservation, who used "Baby Dunn" as a propaganda tool to garner public support for water infrastructure expansion efforts and evacuations.  Luz and her boyfriend Ray kidnap Ig, a neglected toddler about two years old.

References

2015 American novels
Novels set in Los Angeles
2015 debut novels
Dystopian fiction
Climate change in fiction
Climate change novels
Riverhead Books books